Henry Ned Miller (April 12, 1925 – March 18, 2016) was an American country music singer-songwriter. Active as a recording artist from 1956 to 1970, he is known primarily for his hit single "From a Jack to a King", a crossover hit in 1962 which reached Top 10 on the country music, adult contemporary, and Billboard Hot 100 charts, as well as reaching No.2 in the UK charts. He had several more chart singles in his career, although none matched the success of "From a Jack to a King". He also composed and recorded "Invisible Tears".

Biography
Miller's start as a songwriter came when he was sixteen years old. He later joined the United States Marine Corps, from which he was later discharged.

In 1956, both Gale Storm and Bonnie Guitar had Top Five hits with different versions of the song "Dark Moon", which Miller co-wrote. Another song he wrote, "A Fallen Star", was a country hit for Jimmy C. Newman. Very notable is also his uptempo song "Cave In", which in 1960 was the flip side of Warren Smith's No. 5 country hit "I Don't Believe I'll Fall In Love Today" recorded for the Liberty Records label. He also wrote and recorded the song "From a Jack to a King", which was released on Fabor Records but saw little success on the charts. After being briefly signed to Capitol Records, Miller returned to Fabor and persuaded them to re-release "From a Jack to a King". The song proved successful the second time around, and became a crossover hit for Miller. It sold over two million copies by July 1963, and was awarded a gold disc. It was a big hit also in the United Kingdom, where it peaked at No.2 on the singles chart (spending four consecutive weeks there) and became the ninth best-selling single of 1963 in the U.K. in the process (making Miller the only American artist to reach the Top Ten best-sellers of the year in the U.K. that year).

Miller was not particularly interested in his singing career, and rarely toured owing to stage fright. He gave up recording in the 1970s and soon moved to Prescott, Arizona, and later to Las Vegas, Nevada.

Country music artist Ricky Van Shelton covered "From a Jack to a King" in the 1980s; his version reached Number One on the country music chart.

Discography

Albums

Singles

References

1925 births
2016 deaths
American country singer-songwriters
Country musicians from Utah
Capitol Records artists
People from Carbon County, Utah
United States Marine Corps personnel of World War II
Singer-songwriters from Utah